13th meridian may refer to:

13th meridian east, a line of longitude east of the Greenwich Meridian
13th meridian west, a line of longitude west of the Greenwich Meridian